Henrik Niskanen (13 July 1873 – 4 January 1951) was a Finnish farmer, real estate agent and politician, born in Pielavesi. He served as a Member of the Parliament of Finland from 1919 to 1924, representing the Agrarian League.

References

1873 births
1951 deaths
People from Pielavesi
People from Kuopio Province (Grand Duchy of Finland)
Centre Party (Finland) politicians
Members of the Parliament of Finland (1919–22)
Members of the Parliament of Finland (1922–24)